This list of the Cenozoic life of South Carolina contains the various prehistoric life-forms whose fossilized remains have been reported from within the US state of South Carolina and are between 66 million and 10,000 years of age.

A

 †Abra
 †Abra aequalis
 †Abra angulata
  Acanthocardia
 †Acanthocardia claibornense
 Acteocina
 †Acteocina canaliculata
 Acteon
 †Acteon elegans
 †Acteon idoneus
 †Acteon pomilius
 †Adeorbis
  †Adocus
  Aequipecten
 Agaronia
 †Agaronia alabamensis
 †Agaronia bombylis
 Agassizia
 †Agassizia inflata
 †Agassizia wilmingtonica
 †Aglyptorhynchus
 †Agomphus
 †Agomphus alabamensis – or unidentified related form
 †Agomphus pectoralis
 †Agorophius
 †Agorophius pygmaeus
 Aligena
 †Aligena aequata
 †Aligena elevata
 Alligator
  †Alligator mississippiensis
 †Alopecias
 †Alopecias grandis
 Alopias
  †Alopias vulpinus – or unidentified comparable form
 †Altrix
 †Altrix altior
 †Amalthea
 Ammonia
 †Ammonia beccarii
 †Ammonia sobrinus
 Amphistegina
 †Amphistegina gibbosa
 Amusium
 †Amusium mortoni – type locality for species
 Anachis
 †Anachis avara
 Anadara
 †Anadara aequicostata
  †Anadara brasiliana
 †Anadara improcera
 †Anadara lienosa
 †Anadara ovalis
 †Anadara pexata
 †Anadara rustica
  †Anadara transversa
 Anatina
 †Anatina anatina
 Ancilla
 †Ancilla ancillops
 †Ancilla scamba
 †Ancilla staminea
 Angaria – report made of unidentified related form or using admittedly obsolete nomenclature
 †Angaria crassa
 Angulogerina
 †Angulogerina occidentalis
 Angulus
 †Angulus texanus
 †Anomalina
 †Anomalina pliocenica – or unidentified comparable form
 Anomia
 †Anomia jugosa
 †Anomia simplex
  Antalis
 †Antalis minutistriatum
 Antigona
 †Araloselachus
 †Araloselachus cuspidata
  Arbacia
 †Arbacia improcera
 Arca
 †Arca imbricata
 †Arca incongrua
 †Archaeodelphis – type locality for genus
 †Archaeodelphis patrius – type locality for species
  Architectonica
 †Architectonica alveatum
 †Architectonica amoena
 †Architectonica nobilis
 †Architectonica texcarolina
 Arcinella
  †Arcinella arcinella
 †Arcinella cornuta
 Arcopagia
 †Arcopagia raveneli
 †Arcopagia trumani
 Arcoperna
 Arcopsis
 †Arcopsis adamsi
 Arcoscalpellum
  †Arctodus
 †Arctodus pristinus
 Argopecten
 †Argopecten comparilis
 †Argopecten gibbus
  †Argopecten irradians
 Argyrotheca
 †Argyrotheca laevis – type locality for species
 †Argyrotheca quadrata
 Artena
 †Artena undulata
 †Ashleycetus – type locality for genus
 †Ashleycetus planicapitis – type locality for species
 †Ashleychelys – type locality for genus
 †Ashleychelys palmeri – type locality for species
 †Aspideretoides
 †Aspideretoides virginianus – or unidentified comparable form
  Astarte
 †Astarte concentrica
 †Astarte floridana
 †Astarte radians
 †Astarte undulata
 †Astarte vaughani
 Astyris
 †Astyris lunata
  Athleta
 †Athleta cormacki – tentative report
 †Athleta petrosa
 †Athleta petrosus
 Atrina
 †Atrina cawcawensis
 †Atrina rigida
 †Atrina seminuda
 †Atrina serrata
  †Aturia
 †Aturia alabamensis
 †Aturia laticlava – or unidentified comparable form
 Aulacomya
 †Axiopsis
 †Axiopsis eximia – type locality for species

B

 †Bairdemys
 †Bairdemys healeyorum – type locality for species
  Balaenoptera
 Balanophyllia
 Balanus
 †Balanus halosydne – type locality for species
 †Balanus peregrinus
 Balcis
  Barbatia
 †Barbatia cuculloides – or unidentified comparable form
 Barnea
 †Barnea costata
 †Barnea truncata
  †Basilosaurus
 Basterotia
 †Basterotia elliptica
 †Batequeus
 †Batequeus ducenticostatus
 Bathytormus
 †Bathytormus clarkensis
 †Bathytormus flexurus – or unidentified comparable form
 †Bathytormus protexta
 †Belemnoziphius
 †Belemnoziphius prorops – type locality for species
 Bellucina
 †Bellucina waccamawensis
 Bison
  †Bison antiquus
 Bolivina
 †Bolivina lowmani
 †Bolivina marginata
 †Bolivina pseudoplicata
 †Bolivina pseudopunctata
 †Bonellitia
 †Bonellitia garvani
 Boonea
 †Boonea seminuda
 Bornia
 †Bornia triangula
  †Borophagus
 †Borophagus hilli – or unidentified comparable form
 Borsonia
 Bostrycapulus
  †Bostrycapulus aculeatus
 †Bothremys – tentative report
 †Bottosaurus
 †Braarudosphaera
 †Braarudosphaera bigelowii
 Brachidontes
 †Brachidontes alabamensis
 †Brachidontes exustus
 Brissus
 †Brissus spatiosus
 Buccella
 †Buccella frigida
 †Buccella mansfieldi
 Bulimina
 †Bulimina patagonica
 Buliminella
 †Buliminella elegantissima
 Bullia
 †Bullia altilis
 †Bullinella
 †Bullinella galba
 Busycon
 †Busycon carica
  †Busycon contrarium
 †Busycon incile
 †Busycon maximum
 †Busycon perversum
 †Busycotyphis
 †Busycotyphis spiratus
  Busycotypus
 †Busycotypus canaliculatus
 †Busycotypus spiratus
  †Bythaelurus

C

 Cadulus
 †Cadulus thallus
 Caecum
 †Caecum cooperi
 †Caecum ibex
 †Caecum imbricatum
 Caestocorbula
 †Caestocorbula wailesiana
  Calliostoma
 †Calliostoma aphelium – or unidentified comparable form
 Callista
 †Callista aequora
 †Callista alta
 †Callista neusensis
 †Callista perovata
 Callucina
 †Callucina keenae
 †Calorhadia
 †Calorhadia aequalis
 †Calorhadia bella
 †Calorhadia pharcida
 †Calorhadia semen
 Calotrophon
 †Calotrophon ostrearum
 Calyptraea
 †Calyptraea centralis
 †Calyptraphorus
 †Calyptraphorus jacksoni – or unidentified comparable form
 Cancellaria
 †Cancellaria reticulata
 Canis
  †Canis armbrusteri
  †Canis dirus
 Carcharhinus
 †Carcharhinus gibbesi
 Carcharias
 †Carcharias hopei
 †Carcharias macrotus
  Carcharodon
  †Carcharodon hastalis
 †Carcharodon orientalis
 Cardita
 †Cardita gunteri
 Carditamera
 †Carditamera arata
 †Carditamera floridana
 
 †Cardium sublineatum
 †Caricella
 †Caricella pyruloides
 †Carolia
 †Carolia floridana
 †Carolinacetus – type locality for genus
 †Carolinacetus gingerichi – type locality for species
 †Carolinachelys
 †Carolinachelys wilsoni
 †Carolinapecten
 †Carolinapecten eboreus
 Caryocorbula
 †Caryocorbula caribaea
 †Caryocorbula contracta
 †Caryocorbula densata
 Cassidulina
 †Cassidulina caribeana
 †Cassidulina subglobosa
 Castor
  †Castor canadensis
  †Castoroides
 †Castoroides leiseyorum
 †Castoroides ohioensis – or unidentified comparable form
 Cavilinga
 †Cavilinga trisulcata
 †Cavilinga trisulcatus
 Cerithiella – tentative report
 †Cerithiella bicostellata
 Cerithiopsis
 †Cerithiopsis emersonii
 Cerithium – tentative report
 †Cerithium siliceum
 †Cervalces
  †Cervalces scotti
 Cervus
  †Cervus elaphus
 †Ceterhinops – type locality for genus
 †Ceterhinops longifrons – type locality for species
 Chama
 †Chama congregata
 †Chama corticosa
 †Chama gardnerae
 †Chama monroensis
 †Chama radians
 †Chama richardsi
 Cheilea
 Chelydra
  †Chelydra serpentina
 †Chesaconcavus
 †Chesaconcavus belgradensis – type locality for species
 †Chesapecten
  †Chesapecten jeffersonius
 †Chesapecten madisonius
 †Chiasmolithus
 †Chiasmolithus bidens
 Chicoreus
 †Chicoreus floridanus
 Chione
  †Chione cancellata
 †Chione cribraria
 †Chione erosa
 Chionopsis
 †Chionopsis intapurpurea
 Chlamys
 †Chlamys biddleana
 †Chlamys burlesonensis
 †Chlamys cawcawensis
 †Chlamys cocoana – or unidentified comparable form
 †Chlamys cookei
 †Chlamys decemnarius
 †Chlamys deshayesii
 †Chlamys membranosa
 †Chlamys membranosus
 †Chlamys solarioides
 †Chlamys wahtubbeana
 †Chlamys wahtubbeanus
  †Choneziphius
 †Choneziphius chonops – type locality for species
 †Choneziphius liops – type locality for species
 †Choneziphius macrops – type locality for species
 †Choneziphius trachops – type locality for species
 Choristodon
 †Choristodon robustus
  Chrysemys
 †Chrysemys floridana
 †Chrysemys scripta
 †Chrysocetus – type locality for genus
 †Chrysocetus healyorum – type locality for species
 Cibicides
 †Cibicides floridanus
  Cidaris
 †Cidaris pratti
 Cinctura
 †Cinctura lilium
 †Cirostrema
 †Cirostrema nassulum – or unidentified comparable form
 Cirsotrema
 †Cirsotrema spillmani
  Cladocora
 Clavilithes
 †Clavilithes abruptus
 Clavus
 †Clavus lapenotieri – or unidentified related form
 Cliona
 Closia
 †Closia semen
  Coccolithus
 †Coccolithus pelagicus
 Cochlespira
 †Cochlespira bella
 †Cochlespirella
 †Cochlespirella nana
 Cochliolepis
 †Cochliolepis holmesi
 †Cochliolepis parasitica
  Coelopleurus
 †Coelopleurus infulatus
 Coluber – or unidentified comparable form
 Columbellopsis
 †Columbellopsis mississippiensis
 Concavus
 Conomitra
 †Conomitra texana
 †Conosaurops – type locality for genus
 †Conosaurops bowmani – type locality for species
 †Conradostrea
 †Conradostrea sculpturata
 Conus
 †Conus adversarius
 †Conus cormacki
  †Conus delessertii
 †Conus jaspideus
 †Conus marylandicus
 †Conus sauridens
 †Conus smithvillensis
 Coralliophila
 †Coralliophila leonensis
  Corbicula
 †Corbicula densata
  Corbula
 †Corbula alabamiensis
 †Corbula chipolana – or unidentified comparable form
 †Corbula extenuata
 †Corbula fossata
 †Corbula inaequalis
 †Coronia
 †Coronia carodenta
 †Coronia childreni
 †Coronia ludocarola
 †Coronodon – type locality for genus
 †Coronodon havensteini – type locality for species
 †Costaglycymeris
 †Costaglycymeris subovata
 †Cotylocara – type locality for genus
 †Cotylocara macei – type locality for species
 †Coupatezia
 †Coupatezia woutersi
 Crassatella
 †Crassatella alta
 †Crassatella eutawacolens
 †Crassatella eutawcolens
 †Crassatella negreetensis
 †Crassatella rhomboidea
 †Crassatella texalta
 †Crassatella texana
 †Crassatella wilcoxi
 †Crassatella willcoxi
 Crassinella
 †Crassinella dupliniana
 †Crassinella lunulata
  Crassostrea
 †Crassostrea virginica
 †Crenatosiren
 †Crenatosiren olseni
 Crepidula
 †Crepidula convexa
 †Crepidula dumosa
  †Crepidula fornicata
 †Crepidula lirata
  †Crepidula plana
  †Cretolamna
 †Cretolamna appendiculata
 Crucibulum
 †Crucibulum scutellatum
 Cryptonatica
 †Cryptonatica platabasis – or unidentified comparable form
 Ctena
 †Ctena speciosa
 †Cubitostrea
 †Cubitostrea divaricata
 †Cubitostrea lisbonensis
 †Cubitostrea sellaeformis
  Cucullaea
 †Cucullaea transversa
 Cumingia
 †Cumingia keittensis
 †Cumingia tellinoides
  †Cuvieronius
 †Cyclagelosphaera
 Cyclocardia
 †Cyclocardia granulata
 Cyclostremiscus
 †Cyclostremiscus exacuus
 †Cyclostremsicus
 †Cyclostremsicus obliquestriatus
 †Cyclotomodon – type locality for genus
 †Cyclotomodon vagrans – type locality for species
 Cylichna
 †Cylichna acrotoma
 Cymbovula
 †Cymbovula acicularis
  Cypraea
 †Cypraeorbis
 †Cypraeorbis alabamensis
 Cythara
 Cytherea
 †Cytherea aequora

D

 Daphnella
 †Daphnella imperita
 Dasyatis
 †Dasyatis cavernosa
 †Dasyatis rugosa
 Dasypus
  †Dasypus bellus
 Democrinus
  Dendraster
 Dentalium
 †Dentalium attenuatum
 †Dentalium minutistriatum
 Dentimargo
 †Dentimargo aureocinctus
 †Dhondtichlamys
 †Dhondtichlamys greggi – or unidentified related form
 Dinocardium
 †Dinocardium palmerae
 †Dinocardium robustum
 †Dinoziphius
 †Dinoziphius carolinensis – type locality for species
  Diodon
 †Diodon vetus
 Diodora
 †Diodora auroraensis
 †Diodora cattilliformis
  †Diodora cayenensis
 †Diodora pamlicoensis
 †Diodora tenebrosa
 †Dioplotherium – type locality for genus
 †Dioplotherium manigaulti – type locality for species
 Diplodonta
 †Diplodonta acclinis
 †Diplodonta nucleiformis
 †Diplodonta punctata
 †Diplodonta punctulata
 †Diplodonta semiaspera
 †Diplodonta soror
 †Diplodonta ungulina
 †Diplodonta yorkensis
 Discinisca
 †Discinisca lugubris
  †Discoaster
 †Discoaster multiradiatus
 †Discoaster salisburgenesis
 Discoporella
 †Discoporella denticulata
 Discorbis
 †Discorbis columbiensis
 †Discorbis consobrina
 †Discorbis floridensis
 Disporella
 †Disporella denticulata
 Divalinga
 †Divalinga quadrisulcata
 †Divalinga quadrisulcatus
 Donax
 †Donax fossor
  †Donax variabilis
  †Dorudon – type locality for genus
 †Dorudon serratus – type locality for species
 Dosinia
 †Dosinia acetabulum
 †Dosinia chipolana – or unidentified comparable form
 Dosinidia
 †Dosinidia elegans
 Dyocibicides
 †Dyocibicides biserialis

E

 †Eboroziphius – type locality for genus
 †Eboroziphius coelops – type locality for species
 †Eburneopecten
 †Eburneopecten calvatus
 †Eburneopecten scintillatus
  Echinocardium
 †Echinocardium gothicus
 †Echinocardium orthonotum
 †Echovenator – type locality for genus
 †Echovenator sandersi – type locality for species
  †Ecphora
 †Ecphora bradleyae
 †Ecphora quadricostata
 †Ectoganus
 †Ectoganus gliriformis
 †Ectoganus lobdelli
 Elaphe – or unidentified comparable form
 †Ellipsolithus
 †Ellipsolithus distichus
 †Ellipsolithus macellus
  Elphidium
 †Elphidium australis – or unidentified comparable form
 †Elphidium delicatulum
 †Elphidium discoidale
 †Elphidium fimbriatulum
 †Elphidium gunteri
 †Elphidium incertum
 †Elphidium latispatium – or unidentified comparable form
 Encope
 †Encope emarginata
 †Encope macrophora
 Endopachys
 †Endopachys maclurii
  Ensis
 †Ensis directus
 †Ensis minor
 †Eomysticetus – type locality for genus
 †Eomysticetus carolinensis – type locality for species
 †Eomysticetus whitmorei – type locality for species
 Eontia
 †Eontia ponderosa
 †Eophysema
 †Eophysema ozarkana – or unidentified comparable form
 †Eopleurotoma
 †Eopleurotoma carya
 †Eopleurotoma orangeburgensis
 †Eopleurotoma plumbella
 †Eopleurotoma politica
 †Eosurcula
 †Eosurcula pulcherrima
 †Eosurcula quadriplenta
 †Eotorpedo
 †Eotorpedo hilgendorfi
 Episcynia
 †Episcynia inornata
 Epistominella
 †Epistominella pontoni
  Epitonium
 †Epitonium angulatum
 †Epitonium candeanum
 †Epitonium chamberlaini
 †Epitonium charlestonense
 †Epitonium cooperense
 †Epitonium duplinianum
 †Epitonium humphreysi – or unidentified comparable form
 †Epitonium humphreysii
 †Epitonium lamellosum
 †Epitonium multistriatum
 †Epitonium rupicola
 Eponides
 †Eponides repandus
 Equus
  †Eremotherium
 †Eremotherium laurillardi
 Erethizon
  †Erethizon dorsatum
 Erignathus
  †Erignathus barbatus
 Ervilia
 †Ervilia concentrica
 †Ervilia lata
 †Ervilia polita
 Erycina
 †Erycina carolinensis
 Eucrassatella
  †Eucrassatella speciosa
 †Eucrassatella virginica
 Eupatagus
 Eupleura
 †Eupleura caudata
 †Eurhodia
 †Eurhodia baumi
 †Eurhodia holmesi
 †Eurhodia holmesii
 †Eurhodia rugosa
 Eurytellina
 †Eurytellina alternata
 †Eurytellina papyria
 †Euscalpellum
 †Euscalpellum carolinensis – type locality for species
 †Euscalpellum wheeleri – type locality for species
  Euspira
 †Euspira aldrichi
 †Euspira heros
 †Euspira interna
 †Euspira marylandica
 †Euspira sayana
 †Eutrephoceras
 †Eutrephoceras carolinense
 †Eutrephoceras carolinensis
 †Eutrephoceras sloani
 Evalea
 †Evalea melanella

F

 †Fasciculithus
 †Fasciculithus tympaniformis
 Fasciolaria
 †Fasciolaria rhomboidea
  †Fasciolaria tulipa
 †Ficopsis
 †Ficopsis penita
 †Ficopsis texana
  Ficus
 †Ficus affinis
 †Ficus jacksonensis
 Finella
 †Finella dubia
 Flabellum
 †Flabellum cuneiformis
 Fusimitra
 †Fusimitra perexilis
 Fusinus
 †Fusinus abruptus
 †Fusinus equalis
 †Fusinus irrasus
 †Fusinus limulus
 †Fusinus magnocostatus
 †Fusoficula
 †Fusoficula texana

G

 Galeocerdo
 †Galeocerdo aduncus
  †Galeocerdo cuvier
 Galeodea
 †Galeodea petersoni
 Galeorhinus
 Gari
 †Gari eborea
 Gastrochaena
 †Gastrochaena cuneiformis
 †Gastrochaena lingula
  †Gavialosuchus
 †Gavialosuchus americanus
 Gegania
 †Gegania antiquata
 Gemma
 †Gemma magna
 Gemophos
 †Gemophos tinctus
 Geochelone
  †Georgiacetus
 †Georgiacetus vogtlensis – or unidentified comparable form
 Gibbolucina
 †Gibbolucina pandata – or unidentified comparable form
 †Gigantostrea
 †Gigantostrea trigonalis
 Ginglymostoma
 †Ginglymostoma serra
 Globigerina
 Globulina
 †Globulina inaequalis
 Glossus
 †Glossus fraterna
  Glycymeris
 †Glycymeris abberans
 †Glycymeris americana
 †Glycymeris decussata
 †Glycymeris duplinensis – or unidentified related form
 †Glycymeris idonea
 †Glycymeris quinquerugatus
 †Glycymeris staminea
 †Glycymeris subovatus
 Glyptoactis
 †Glyptoactis alticostata
 †Glyptoactis blandingi
 †Glyptoactis complexicosta
 †Glyptoactis nasuta
  †Glyptotherium
 †Glyptotherium floridanum
 Gopherus
 Gouldia
 †Gouldia metastriata
 †Gryphodobatis
 †Gryphodobatis uncus
 †Gumbelina
  Gymnura

H

 †Haimesiastraea
 †Haimesiastraea conferta
 Halichoerus – or unidentified comparable form
  †Halichoerus grypus
  †Halitherium
 †Halitherium alleni – type locality for species
 †Halonanus
 †Halonanus declivis
 Hanzawaia
 †Hanzawaia concentrica
 Hastula – report made of unidentified related form or using admittedly obsolete nomenclature
 †Hastula venusta
 Haustator
 †Haustator carinata
 †Haustator rina
  †Hemiauchenia
 †Hemiauchenia macrocephala
 Hemimactra
 †Hemimactra solidissima
 Hemimetis
 †Hemimetis magnoliana
  Hemipristis
 †Hemipristis serra
 Here
 †Here parawhitfieldi – or unidentified comparable form
 †Heterotorpedo
 †Heterotorpedo fowleri
 Hexaplex
 †Hexaplex colei
 Hiatella
  †Holmesina
 †Holmesina septentrionalis
 †Hoplocetus
 †Hoplocetus obesus – type locality for species
 †Hornibrookina
 †Hornibrookina arca
 Horologica
 †Horologica pupa
 Hyotissa
 †Hyotissa haitensis
 †Hyposaurus

I

 Ilyanassa
 †Ilyanassa irrorata
 †Ilyanassa obsoleta
 †Ilyanassa trivittata
 Infundibulum
 †Infundibulum carinatum
 †Infundibulum depressum
  †Ischyodus
 †Isocrania
 Isognomon
 †Isogomphodon 
 †Isogomphodon aikenensis – type locality for species

J

 †Jacquhermania
 †Jacquhermania duponti

K

 Kalolophus
 †Kalolophus antillarum
 †Kapalmerella
 †Kapalmerella arenicola
 †Kapalmerella mortoni
 †Keasius – tentative report
 †Keasius parvus
  Kinosternon
 †Kleidionella
 †Kleidionella lobata
  Kurtziella
 †Kurtziella cerina

L

 †Labrodon
 †Labrodon carolinensis
 †Laevibuccinum
 †Laevibuccinum prorsum
  Laevicardium
 †Laevicardium mortoni
 †Laevicardium serratum
 Lamarckina
 †Lamarckina atlantica
  Lamna
 †Lamna obliqua
 Latirus – tentative report
 †Leiorhynus
 †Leiorhynus prorutus
 Leodia
 Leptopecten
 †Leptopecten leonensis
 †Levifusus
 †Levifusus mortonii
 Lima
  Limaria
 †Limaria carolinensis
 Limatula
 Limopsis
 †Limopsis aviculoides – or unidentified related form
 Linga
 †Linga waccamawensis
 †Linthia
 †Linthia hanoverensis
 †Linthia harmatuki
 †Linthia wilmingtonensis
  Liotia
 †Liotia major – or unidentified related form
 †Lirodiscus
 †Lirodiscus santeensis
 †Lirodiscus smithvillensis
 †Lirofusus
 †Lirofusus thoracicus
 Lirophora
 †Lirophora latilirata
 Lithophaga
 †Lithophaga claibornensis – or unidentified comparable form
 †Litorhadia
 †Litorhadia compsa
 Littoraria
 †Littoraria irrorata
 †Littoraria irroratus
 Lucina
 †Lucina pensylvanica
 †Lucina punctulata
 Lucinisca
 †Lucinisca cribrarius
  Lunularia
 †Lunularia distans
 Lynx
  †Lynx rufus
 Lyria
 †Lyrischapa

M

 Macoma
  †Macoma balthica
 †Macoma calcarea
 †Macoma constricta
 †Macoma tenta
 †Macoma virginiana
 Macrocallista
 †Macrocallista albaria
 †Macrocallista maculata
 †Macrocallista nimbosa
 †Macrocallista reposta
 Mactra
 Mactrotoma
 †Mactrotoma fragilis
 Malaclemys
 †Malaclemys terrapin
 †Mammut
  †Mammut americanum
 †Mammuthus
  †Mammuthus columbi – or unidentified comparable form
 Manta
 †Manta fragilis
 Maretia
 †Maretia subrostrata
  Marginella
 †Marginella semen
 Martesia
 †Martesia cuneiformis
 †Marvacrassatella
 †Mathilda
 †Mathilda retisculpta
 †Mauricia
 †Mauricia houstonia
  †Megalonyx
 †Megalonyx jeffersonii
  Meiocardia
 †Meiocardia carolinae
 Melampus
 †Melampus bidentatus
 Melanella
 †Melanella conoidea
 †Melanella magnoliana
 Mellita
 †Mellita carolinana
 †Mellita quinquesperforata
 Menippe – tentative report
 Mercenaria
 †Mercenaria campechiensis
 †Mercenaria corrugata
 †Mercenaria mercenaria
 †Mercimonia – tentative report
 †Mercimonia mercenaroidea
 Merisca
 †Merisca aequistriata
 Mesalia
 †Mesalia allentonensis
 †Mesalia claibornensis
 †Mesalia gomin
 †Mesalia obruta
 Mesodesma
 †Mesodesma concentrica
 Metalia
 †Metalia raveneliana
  †Metaxytherium
 †Metaxytherium albifontanum
 Metis – tentative report
 †Metis eutawensis
  Microdrillia
 †Microdrillia citrona
 †Micromysticetus – type locality for genus
 †Micromysticetus rothauseni – type locality for species
 †Mingotherium
 †Mingotherium holtae – type locality for species
  †Miracinonyx
 †Miracinonyx inexpectatus
 Mitrella
 †Mitrella bastropensis
 †Mitrella bucciniformis
 †Mitrella casteri
 †Mitrella lunulata
 Mnestia
 †Mnestia dekayi
  Mobula
 †Mobula loupianensis – or unidentified comparable form
 Modiolus
 †Modiolus cawcawensis
 †Modiolus gigas
 Moerella
 Mulinia
 †Mulinia congesta
 †Mulinia lateralis
 Murex
 †Murex engonata
 Murexiella
 †Murexiella glypta
 †Murexiella macgintyi
 †Murexiella petiti – type locality for species
 †Murexiella shilohensis
 †Murotriton
 †Murotriton mcglameriae
 †Mya
 †Mya arenaria
  Myliobatis
 †Myliobatis gigas
 †Myliobatis magister
  †Mylohyus
 †Mylohyus fossilis – or unidentified comparable form
 Mysella
 †Mysella velaini
 Mytilus
 †Mytilus conradinus

N

 †Nanosiren – tentative report
  Nassarius
 †Nassarius acutus
 †Nassarius floridana
 †Nassarius quadrulatus
 †Nassarius vibex
 Natica
 †Natica pusila
  Naticarius
 †Naticarius semilunata
 †Nayadina
 Nebrius
 Nemocardium
 †Neochoerus
 †Neochoerus aesopi
 †Neochoerus pinckneyi
 Neofiber
 †Neofiber alleni
 †Neofiber diluvianus – or unidentified comparable form
 Neomonachus
  †Neomonachus tropicalis
 †Neuconorbina
 †Neuconorbina terquemi
  Neverita
 †Neverita duplicatus
  Nodipecten
 †Nodipecten collierensis
 Noetia
 †Noetia incile
 †Noetia limula
 †Noetia trigintinaria
 Nonion
 Nonionella
 †Nonionella atlantica
 Notidanus
 †Notidanus primigenius
  Nucula
 †Nucula magnifica
 †Nucula mauricensis
 †Nucula ovalis
 †Nucula ovula
 †Nucula proxima
 †Nucula ripae
 †Nucula sphenopsis
 Nuculana
 †Nuculana acuta
 †Nuculana calcarensis
 †Nuculana carolinensis
 †Nuculana flexuosa – or unidentified related form
 †Nuculana kittensis
 †Nuculana magnopsis
 †Nuculana subtrigona
 †Nuculana trochila
 †Nuculana trumani
 †Nuculana vanuxemi

O

 Oculina
 †Oculina wagneriana
 Odobenus
  †Odobenus rosmarus
 Odocoileus
  †Odocoileus virginianus
 †Odontapsis
 Odostomia
 †Odostomia carolina
 †Odostomia pedroana – or unidentified comparable form
 Oliva
 †Oliva canaliculata
 †Oliva carolinae
 †Oliva carolinensis
 †Oliva sayana
 Olivella
 †Olivella carolinae
 †Olivella mutica
 †Olivella nitidula
 †Ontocetus
 †Ontocetus emmonsi
  †Ophiomorpha
 Orthoyoldia
 †Orthoyoldia claibornensis
 †Orthoyoldia psammotaea
 †Osteopygis
 †Osteopygis emarginatus
 Ostrea
 †Ostrea arrosis
 †Ostrea carolinensis
 †Ostrea compressirostrea
 †Ostrea disparilis
 †Ostrea locklini
 †Ostrea ludoviciana
 †Ostrea normalis
 †Otodus
 †Otodus angustidens
  †Otodus megalodon
 †Oxyrhina
 †Oxyrhina praecursor
 †Oxyrhina retroflexa

P

 †Pachecoa
 †Pachecoa cainei
 †Pachecoa decisa
 †Pachecoa ellipsis
 †Pachecoa ledoides
 †Pachecoa pulchra
 †Pachyarmatherium
 †Pachyarmatherium leiseyi
 †Palaeochenoides – tentative report
 †Palaeochenoides mioceanus
 †Palaeohypotodus
 †Palaeohypotodus rutoti
 †Palaeolama
 †Palaeolama mirifica
  †Palaeophis
 Pandora
 †Pandora trilineata
 Panopea
 †Panopea reflexa
 Panthera
  †Panthera leo
  †Panthera onca
 Paracyathus
 †Paracyathus vaughani
 Paradentalium
 †Paradentalium disparile – or unidentified related form
 †Paramya
 †Paramya subovata
  †Paramylodon
 †Paramylodon harlani – or unidentified comparable form
 Parasmittina
 †Parasmittina trispinosa
 Parvanachis
 †Parvanachis obesa
 Parvilucina
 †Parvilucina costata
 †Parvilucina crenella
 †Parvilucina crenulata
 †Parvilucina multilineatus
 †Parvilucina multistriata
 †Parvilucina piluliformis – or unidentified comparable form
 †Pecchiola
 †Pecchiola dalliana
 Pecten
 †Pecten acanikos
 †Pecten elixatus
 †Pecten hemicyclicus
 †Pectinucula
 †Pectinucula ripae
  †Pelagornis
 †Pelagornis longirostris
 †Pelagornis sandersi – type locality for species
  Penion
 †Penion bellus
 †Peratotoma
 †Peratotoma insignifica
 †Periarchus
 †Periarchus lyelli
 Periploma
 †Periploma collardi
 †Periploma inequale
  Petaloconchus
 †Petaloconchus graniferus
 †Petaloconchus sculpturatus
  Petricola
 †Petricola lata
 †Petricola pholadiformis
 Phacoides
 †Phacoides alveatus
 †Phacoides contractus
 Phalium
  Phoca
 †Phoca debilis – type locality for species
 †Phoca modesta – type locality for species
 Pholadomya
 †Pholadomya harrisi
 Pholas
 †Pholas campechiensis
 †Pholas turgidus
 Phos
 †Phos sagenum
 †Phos sagenus
 †Phos sloani
 Phyllonotus
 †Phyllonotus pomum
 Physa
 †Physa meigsii – or unidentified related form
  Physeter
 †Physeter antiquus – type locality for species
 †Physogaleus
 Pinna
  Pitar
 †Pitar chioneformis
 †Pitar morrhuanus
 †Pitar ovatus
 †Pitar poulsoni
 †Pitar trigoniata
 Placopecten
 Placunanomia
 †Placunanomia burnsi
 †Placunanomia plicata
 †Plagiarca
 †Plagiarca rhomboidell
 †Plagiarca rhomboidella
 †Planicardium
 †Planicardium acutilaqueatum
  Planorbis
 Planorbulina
 †Planorbulina mediterraneansis
 Planulina
 †Planulina exorna
 †Planulina faveolata
 Platytrochus
 †Platytrochus stokesi
 Pleuromeris
 †Pleuromeris parva
 †Pleuromeris tridentata
  Pleurotomaria
 †Plicatoria
 †Plicatoria parva – type locality for species
 †Plicatoria wilmingtonensis
 Plicatula
 †Plicatula filamentosa
 †Plicatula gibbosa
 †Plicatula lapidosa
 †Plinthicus
 †Plinthicus stenodon
 Polinices
 †Polinices eminulus
 Polymesoda
 †Polymesoda caroliniana
 Poroeponides
 †Poroeponides lateralis
 †Prinsius
 †Prinsius bisulcus
  †Prionodon
 †Prionodon carolinensis – type locality for species
 †Prionodon egertoni
 †Priscosiren
 †Priscosiren atlantica
  Pristis
 †Pristis ensidens
 †Pristis lathami
 †Probolarina
 †Probolarina holmesi
 †Probolarina holmesii
 †Probolarina salpinx
 †Probolarina transversa – type locality for species
 †Procharodon
 †Procolpochelys
 †Procolpochelys charlestonensis – type locality for species
 Procyon
  †Procyon lotor
 †Propinnotheroides – type locality for genus
 †Propinnotheroides orangeburgensis – type locality for species
 †Protoscutella
 †Protoscutella conradi
 †Protoscutella mississippiensis
 †Protoscutella plana
 †Protosiren
 Prunum
 †Prunum contractum
 †Prunum limatulum
 †Prunum roscidum
  Psammechinus
 †Psammechinus philanthropus
  †Psephophorus
 Pseudochama
 †Pseudochama corticosa
 Pseudoliva
 †Pseudoliva vetusta
 Pseudorca
  †Pseudorca crassidens
 Pteria
 †Pteria colymbus
 Pteromeris
 †Pteromeris perplana
 †Pteropsella
 †Pteropsella lapidosa
 Puellina
 †Puellina radiata
  †Puma
 †Puma concolor
 Puncturella
 Pusula
 †Pusula pediculus
 Pycnodonte
 †Pycnodonte trigonalis
 †Pycnodonte vicksburgensis
  Pyramidella
 †Pyramidella chavani
 †Pyramidella crenuata
 †Pyramidella propeacicula
 †Pyramidella suturalis
 Pyrgo
 Pyrulina
 †Pyrulina albatrossi

Q

 †Quadrans
 †Quadrans lintea
  Quinqueloculina
 †Quinqueloculina compta
 †Quinqueloculina funafutiensis
 †Quinqueloculina lamarckiana
 †Quinqueloculina lamarkiana
 †Quinqueloculina sabulosa
 †Quinqueloculina seminulum
 †Quinquerugatus
 †Quinquerugatus holthuisi

R

 Radiolucina
 †Radiolucina amianta
 †Radiolucina aminata
 †Radiolucina tuomeyi
 Raeta
 †Raeta plicatella
 Raja
 †Raja mccollumi – type locality for species
 Rangia
 †Rangia clathrodonta
 †Rangia cuneata
 Rangifer
  †Rangifer tarandus – or unidentified comparable form
  Ranina
 Raphitoma
 †Raphitoma carla
 †Raphitoma carolia
 †Raphitoma stantoni
 †Raphitoma tabulatum
 †Recurvaster
  Retusa
 Reussella
 †Reussella spinulosa – or unidentified comparable form
 †Rhabdopitaria
 †Rhabdopitaria discoidalis
  Rhincodon
 †Rhincodon typus – or unidentified comparable form
 Rhinobatos
 †Rhinobatos bruxelliensis
 †Rhinobatos lentiginosus – or unidentified comparable form
 Rhinoptera
  †Rhinoptera bonasus – or unidentified comparable form
 †Rhinoptera dubia
 †Rhinoptera studeri – or unidentified comparable form
 Rhizoprionodon
 †Rhizoprionodon teraenovae – or unidentified comparable form
  Rhynchobatus
 †Rhynchobatus pristinus
 Rhyncholampas
 Robulus
 †Robulus americanus
 Rosalina
 †Rosalina columbiensis
 Rostellaria – report made of unidentified related form or using admittedly obsolete nomenclature
 †Rostellaria bullata
 †Rostellaria conus
 †Rostellaria filiformis
 †Rostellaria minor
 †Rostellaria rudis

S

 †Santeelampas
 †Santeelampas oviformis
 †Santeevoluta
 †Santeevoluta wilmingtonensis
 Sassia
 †Sassia septemdentata
 †Saurocetus – type locality for genus
 †Saurocetus gibbesii – type locality for species
 Sayella
 †Sayella fusca
 Scalina
 †Scalina trapaquara
 Scapharca
 †Scapharca brasiliana
 †Scapharca staminata
  Scaphella
 Schizoporella
 †Schizoporella unicornis
 Scobinella
 †Scobinella ferrosilica
 †Scobinella nassiformis
 Sconsia
 †Sconsia hodgii
  Scyliorhinus – tentative report
  Seila
 †Seila adamsii
 Semele
 †Semele australina
 †Semele bellastriata
 †Semele carinata
 †Semele linosa
 †Semele pacifica
 †Semele proficua
 †Semele purpurascens
 †Semele purpurescens
 †Semele subovata
 †Septastrea
 †Septastrea crassa
 †Septastrea marylandica
 Serpulorbis
 †Serpulorbis granifer
 †Serpulorbis squamulosus
 Sigatica
 †Sigatica carolinensis
  Sigmodon
 †Sigmodon bakeri
  Sinum
 †Sinum arctatum
 †Sinum beatricae
 †Sinum bilix
 †Sinum chesapeakensis
 †Sinum chipolanum – or unidentified comparable form
 †Sinum declive
 †Sinum inconstans
 †Sinum perspectivum
 Siphocypraea
 †Siphocypraea carolinensis
 Siphonina
 †Siphonina pulchra
 †Sismondia
 †Sismondia plana
  †Smilodon
 †Smilodon fatalis
 Solariella
 †Solariella gemma
 †Solariella tricostata
 Solariorbis
 †Solariorbis depressus
  Solemya
 †Solemya alabamensis
 Solen
 †Solen ensis
 †Solen viridis
 Solena
 Solenosteira
 †Solenosteira cancellaria
 †Spatangus
 †Spatangus glenni
 Sphyrna
 †Sphyrna americana – type locality for species
 †Sphyrna media – or unidentified comparable form
  †Sphyrna zygaena
 Spirillina
 †Spirillina decorata
 Spisula
 †Spisula decisa
 †Spisula praetenuis
  Spondylus
 †Spondylus lamellacea
 Sportella
 †Sportella constricta
 †Sportella protexta
  †Squalodon
 †Squalodon crassus – type locality for species
 †Squalodon pelagius – type locality for species
 †Squalodon tiedemani – type locality for species
  Squatina
 †Squatina angeloides – or unidentified comparable form
 Stewartia
 †Stewartia anodonta
 Sthenorytis
 †Sthenorytis subexpansum
 Strigilla
 †Strigilla mirabilis
 Strioterebrum
 †Strioterebrum concava
 †Strioterebrum dislocata
 †Strioterebrum dislocatum
 Strombus
 †Strombus pugilis
 Subcancilla
 †Subcancilla dalli – or unidentified related form
 †Sulcocypraea
 †Sulcocypraea kennedyi
 †Sulcocypraea vaughani
 Sveltella
 †Sveltella parva
 Sveltia
 †Sveltia alveata
 †Syllomus
  Sylvilagus

T

 Tagelus
 †Tagelus plebeius
  Tapirus
 †Tapirus haysii
 †Tapirus veroensis
  Tectonatica
 †Tectonatica pusilla
 Teinostoma
 Tellidora
 †Tellidora cristata
 Tellina
 †Tellina declivis
 †Tellina leana
 †Tellina subequalis
 †Tellina tallicheti
 Tenagodus
 †Tenagodus vitis
 †Tenagodus vitus – or unidentified comparable form
  Terebra
 †Terebra houstonia
 †Terebra protexta
 †Terebra tantula – or unidentified related form
 †Terebra texagyra
 †Terebraspira
 †Terebraspira elegans
 †Terebraspira sparrowi
 Terebratulina
 †Terebratulina lachryma
 †Terebratulina wilsoni – type locality for species
 †Terebrifusus
 †Terebrifusus amoenus
 †Teredina
 †Teredina fistula
 Teredo
 †Teredo calamus
 Terrapene
  †Terrapene carolina
 Textularia
 †Textularia jurassica
  †Thecachampsa
 †Thecachampsa carolinensis – type locality for species
  †Thoracosaurus
 Thracia
 †Thracia dalli
 †Thracia magna
 Timoclea
 †Timoclea grus
 Torcula
 †Torcula variabilis
 †Toweius
 †Toweius pertusus
 Trachycardium
 †Trachycardium egmontianum
 †Trachycardium muricatum
 Transennella
 †Transennella carolinensis
 †Transennella stimpsoni
  Tremarctos
 †Tremarctos floridanus
 Triakis – tentative report
  Trichechus
 †Triforis
 †Trigonarca
 †Trigonarca corbuloides
 Trigonostoma
 †Trigonostoma aurorae
 †Trigonostoma babylonicum
 †Trigonostoma panones
 †Trigonostoma pulcherrimum
 †Trinacria
 †Trinacria cuneus
  Triplofusus
 †Triplofusus giganteus
 Trivia
 Trochammina
 Trochita
 †Trochita aperta
 Trochus
 †Trochus philantropus
 †Tuba
 †Tuba antiquata
  Tucetona
 †Tucetona arata
 †Tucetona lamyi – or unidentified comparable form
 †Tucetona pectinata
 †Tupelocetus – type locality for genus
 †Tupelocetus palmeri – type locality for species
 Turbo – report made of unidentified related form or using admittedly obsolete nomenclature
 †Turbo biliratus
 Turbonilla
 †Turbonilla aragoni – or unidentified comparable form
 †Turbonilla interrupta
 Turricula
 †Turricula polita
  Turris
 †Turris desnoyersii
 †Turris lerchi
 †Turris lesueuri
 †Turris lonsdalei
 †Turris moorei
 †Turris nodocarinata
 †Turris nupera
 †Turris prosseri
 †Turris texanopsis
  Turritella
 †Turritella alcida
 †Turritella alticostata
 †Turritella burdeni
 †Turritella dutexata
 †Turritella etiwanensis
 †Turritella ghigna
 †Turritella holmesi
 †Turritella mcbeanensis
 †Turritella mingoensis
 †Turritella nasuta
 †Turritella perexilis
 †Turritella subanulata
 †Turritella vaughani
 Tursiops
  †Tursiops truncatus – or unidentified comparable form
 †Tusciziphius
 †Tusciziphius atlanticus
 †Tympanonesiotes – type locality for genus
 †Tympanonesiotes wetmorei – type locality for species
 Typhis
 †Typhis floridanus

U

 †Unifascia
 †Unifascia carolinensis
 Urocyon
  †Urocyon cinereoargenteus – or unidentified comparable form
 Urosalpinx
 †Urosalpinx cinerea
 †Urosalpinx trossula

V

 Valvulineria
 Venericardia
 †Venericardia bilineata
 †Venericardia carolinensis
 †Venericardia claiboplata
 †Venericardia claviger
 †Venericardia eutawcolens
 †Venericardia klimacodes
 †Venericardia mingoensis
 †Venericardia planicosta
 †Venericardia rotunda
 †Venericardia subquadrata
 †Venericardia subrotunda
 †Venericardia vigintinaria
 †Verericardia
 Vermicularia
 †Vermicularia fargoi
 †Vermicularia spirata
 Verticordia
 †Verticordia emmonsi
 Vexillum
 †Vexillum wandoense
  Vitis
  Voluta
 †Voluta mutabilis
 †Voluticella
 †Voluticella levensis
 Volutifusus
 †Volutifusus mutabilis

X

 Xenophora
  †Xenophora conchyliophora
 †Xenorophus – type locality for genus
 †Xenorophus sloanii – type locality for species
 †Xiphiorhynchus
 †Xiphiorhynchus rotundus
 †Xylotrypa
 †Xylotrypa palmulata

Y

 Yoldia
 †Yoldia laevis
  †Yoldia limatula
 †Yoldia tarphaeia

Z

 †Zanthopsis – tentative report
 †Zygodiscus
 †Zygodiscus herlyni

References

 

South Carolina
Cenozoic